Ladoo is a 2018 Indian Malayalam-language romantic comedy film directed by debutant Arungeorge K David, Written by Sagar Sathyan and produced by S Vinod Kumar for Mini Studio. The film stars Vinay Forrt, Shabareesh Varma and Balu Varghese and newcomer Gayathri Ashok. Dileesh Pothan has supporting roles. The music is composed by Rajesh Murugesan, while Gautham Sankar is the cinematographer. Lalkrishnan S. Achuthan is the editor. The film had a theatrical release on 17 November 2018.

Synopsis 

Vinu and Angeline, a couple in love, decide to elope and get married. But when a bunch of friends gets involved, the plan itself starts spiraling out of control. The chaos that ensues forms the crux of Ladoo.

Cast 

 Vinay Forrt as Vinu
 Sabareesh Varma as SK
 Balu Varghese as Rahul
 Manoj Guinness as Lovlesh
 Vijo Vijayakumar as Jinto
 Saju Navodaya as Itoope
 Dileesh Pothan as Suresh
 Bobby Simha as Joseph Dayanidhi (cameo)
 Indrans as Judge
 Vini Vishwa Lal as Alex
 Gayathri Ashok as Angeline
 Anna A Smith (Angeline's childhood)
 Nisha Sarang as Angeline's Mother
 Seema G. Nair as S.K.'s Mother
 Sayana Sunil as Apsara S
 Mukundan as Gangadharan
Jisjoy as Narrator (Voice Over)

Production
Director Arungeorge K David first announced from his Facebook profile that Ladoo will be produced by Mini Studio, and presented by Dhanush. Shabareesh Varma, Balu Varghese, and Saju Navodaya were first confirmed to play roles in the film. Rajesh Murugesan, the music director of Premam was confirmed to compose the music for the film. Gautham Sankar was also confirmed as cinematographer.

Filming
Principal photography commenced on 10 May 2017 in Thrissur, Kerala. The main filming location was at Thrissur.

References

External links
 
 

2010s Malayalam-language films
2018 romantic comedy films
2018 directorial debut films
2018 films
Films shot in Kochi
Indian romantic comedy films
Films scored by Rajesh Murugesan
Films shot in Thrissur